Oluwadara Johnson Treseder is a Nigerian born marketing executive, raised in Ibadan.

Overview 
Having worked in executive roles at Apple and GE, and as chief marketing officer at Carbon, she joined exercise equipment company Peloton as SVP and head of global marketing and communications in August 2020. Marie Claire magazine credits her as being behind the success of Peloton during the COVID-19 pandemic. NPR called her "one of the most influential marketing leaders of her generation".

She left Peloton and was appointed Chief Marketing Officer of Autodesk in 2022. Peloton stock dipped amid news of its marketing head going to work for Autodesk.

She is also a founding member of the Black Executive CMO Alliance, and vice-chair of the board of the Public Health Institute. She is one of a team of backers of W Magazine.

In 2022, she was recognized by Forbes as the #1 most influential CMO in the world.

She is an alumnus of Harvard University and of Stanford Graduate School of Business, where she obtained an MBA in 2014.

She is married to William Treseder; they have two children.

References

External links 

 
 

Living people
Year of birth missing (living people)
Nigerian business executives
Nigerian women business executives
American business executives
American women business executives
Marketing people
Stanford Graduate School of Business alumni
Harvard University alumni
21st-century American women